General Harmon may refer to:

Ernest N. Harmon (1894–1979), U.S. Army major general
Hubert R. Harmon (1892–1957), U.S. Air Force lieutenant general
Millard Harmon (1888–1945), U.S. Army Air Forces lieutenant general
Reginald C. Harmon (1900–1992), U.S. Air Force major general

See also
General Harman (disambiguation)